Chisholm Trail was a trail in the post American Civil War era to drive cattle overland from ranches in Texas to Kansas railheads.

It may also refer to:

Roads
 Chisholm Trail Parkway in Texas

Cycleways
 Chisholm Trail (Cambridge), a walking and cycling route in Cambridge, England

Schools
 Chisholm Trail High School in Fort Worth, Texas
 Chisholm Trail Academy, co-educational high school in Keene, Texas

Games
 Chisholm Trail (video game), a computer game released in 1982

See also
Chisholm (disambiguation)